Sydney Ewing (born February 16, 1995, in Louisiana) is a retired American collegiate artistic gymnast. She competed in the NCAA for Louisiana State University and their gymnastics team.

Early life 
Sydney Ewing was born on February 16, 1995, to parents, Ned and Donna Ewing. She has an older brother, Travis, who was a contestant on the eighth season of The Voice. Her mother, Donna, is a gymnastics coach and was the head personal coach to Sydney throughout her club competitive career. In 2013, Ewing graduated from Lafayette High School.

Gymnastics career 
Ewing trained at Acadiana Gymnastics Training Center in Lafayette, Louisiana throughout her entire club competitive career.

2009-13: Club competitive career 
Sydney moved up to Level 10 for the 2009 season; at the age of fourteen At Regionals, she placed eighteenth in the all-around. In 2010, she was third at States and was tenth at Regionals. At her first J.O. NIT, in Dallas, Texas, Ewing placed tenth in the all-around. Ewing was Louisiana State champion in 2011. and was fifth in the all-around and second on beam at Regionals. At Nationals, she was thirty-fifth in the all-around. Ewing defended her State title during the 2012 season. Later, Sydney finished ninth in the all-around at Regionals; advancing to JO NIT. On June 29, 2012, Ewing committed to Louisiana State University and the LSU Lady Tigers gymnastics team. At the NIT, Ewing was fifth in the all-around. Her final season was in 2013; finishing second at Regionals. At Nationals, she finished thirty-first in the all-around.

2014–2017: College gymnastics career 
Throughout the recruiting process, Ewing was offered scholarships to the Georgia Gym Dogs, New Hampshire Wildcats and Southern Utah Thunderbirds teams. However, she decided to walk-on to LSU. She retired from gymnastics on June 7, 2017.

2014 season: Freshman

References 

1995 births
Living people
Louisiana State University alumni